This list aims to display alphabetically the 1,145 titular deputies (291 deputies of the clergy, 270 of the nobility and 584 of the Third Estate-commoners) elected to the Estates-General of 1789, which became the National Assembly on 17 June 1789 and the National Constituent Assembly on 9 July 1789; as well as the alternate delegates who sat.

A
 Luc René Charles Achard de Bonvouloir (1744–1827), deputy of the nobility of the bailiwick of Coutances.
 Louis Joseph Adam de Verderonne (1753–1831), deputy of the Third Estate of the bailiwick of Crépy-en-Valois.
 Henri Cardin Jean-Baptiste d'Aguesseau (1747–1826), deputy of the nobility of the bailiwick of Meaux.
 Armand Désirée de Vignerot Duplessis-Richelieu, duc d'Aiguillon (1761–1800), deputy of the nobility of Agen.
 Michel François d'Ailly, deputy of the Third Estate of Chaumont-en-Vexin.
 Antoine Balthazar Joachim d'André
 Antoine Andurand (1747–1818), deputy of the Third Estate of the sénéchaussée of Rouergue at Villefranche.
 François-Paul-Nicolas Anthoine (1720–1793), deputy of the Third Estate of the bailiwick of Sarreguemines.
 Louis-Alexandre de Launay, comte d'Antraigues, (1753–1812), deputy of the nobility of the sénéchaussée of Vivarais.
 Charles André Rémy Arnoult, (1754–1796), deputy of the Third Estate of the bailiwick of Dijon, Côte d'Or.
 Edme Aubert, (1738–1804), deputy of the clergy of the bailiwick of Chaumont-en-Bassigny.
 René François Jean Aubrée, (1763–1808)

B
 René Gaston Baco de la Chapelle, (1751–1800), deputy of the Third Estate of the bailiwick of Nantes.
 Jean Sylvain Bailly (1736–1793), deputy of the Third Estate of the ville and the surroundings of Paris.
 Charles Marie de Barbeyrac, (Marquis of Saint-Maurice), deputy of the nobility of the sénéchaussée of Montpellier.
 Pierre-Louis Barbou (?-?), deputy of the clergy of the bailiwick of Meaux.
 Bertrand Barère de Vieuzac, (1755–1841), deputy of the Third Estate of the bailiwick of Toulouse.
 Antoine Barnave, (1761–1793), deputy of the Third Estate
 Alexandre François Marie, vicomte de Beauharnais (1760–1794), deputy of the nobility of the bailiwick of Blois.
 Bon-Albert Briois de Beaumetz, (1759–1801), deputy of the nobility of Artois.
 Jacques-François Begouën, (1743–1831), deputy of the Third Estate of the bailiwick of Caux.
 François Becherel, (1732–1815),
 Nicolas Bergasse, (1750–1832), deputy of the Third Estate of the sénéchaussée of Lyon.
 Louis de Boislandry, (1750–1834), deputy of the Third Estate of Paris
 Jean de Dieu-Raymond de Boisgelin de Cucé
 Charles-François de Bonnay
 Jean-Joseph de Bonnegens des Hermitans (1750–1817), deputy of the Third Estate of the sénéchaussée of Saint-Jean-d'Angély.
 Jean Nicolas Bordeaux, deputy of the Third Estate of Chaumont-en-Vexin.
 Jean-Baptiste Bottex (Abbot), (?- 1792), deputy of the clergy
 Jean-Pierre Boullé (1753–1816), deputy of the Third Estate of the sénéchaussée of Ploërmel.
 Jean Anthelme Brillat-Savarin, (1755–1826), deputy of the Third Estate of the bailiwick of Bugey.
 Pierre-Louis-Robert de Briois, (?- ?), deputy of the nobility of Artois.
 Jean-Xavier Bureau de Pusy (1750–1806).
 François Nicolas Léonard Buzot (1760–1794), deputy of the Third Estate of the bailiwick of Évreux.

C
 Armand-Gaston Camus (1740–1804), deputy of the Third Estate of the prévôté and of the Viscountcy of Paris.
 Boniface Louis André de Castellane-Novejean, (1758–1837), deputy of the nobility of the bailiwick of Châteauneuf-en-Thymerais, in the Perche.
 Charles de la Croix de Castries (1756–1842), deputy of the nobility of the prévôté and of the Viscountcy of Paris.
 Jacques Antoine Marie de Cazalès (1748–1805), deputy of the nobility of the bailiwick of Rivière-Verdun.
 Charles Antoine Chasset, (1748–1805), deputy of the Third Estate of the sénéchaussée of Villefranche (Saône-et-Loire).
 Jean-Antoine-Auguste de Chastenet de Puységur, Archbishop of Bourges, (1740–1815), deputy of the clergy of the bailiwick of Bourges.
 Louis Marie Florent du Châtelet (1727–1793), deputy of the nobility of the bailiwick of Bar-le-Duc.
 François-Charles Chevreuil (d. 1792), Chancellor of the Church and of the University of Paris, deputy of the clergy of Paris.
 Stanislas Marie Adelaide, comte de Clermont-Tonnerre (1757–1792), deputy of the nobility of the prévôté and the Viscountcy of Paris.
 Robert Coquille
 Pierre-Paul Colonna de Cesari Rocca, (1748- ?), deputy of the Third Estate of the Island of Corsica.
 Jean Colson (1734–1801), deputy of the clergy of the bailiwick of Sarreguemines.
 Félix-François-Dorothée de Balbes de Berton de Crillon (1748–1820)
 Louis-Pierre-Nolasque de Balbes de Berton de Crillon (Duke of), (1742–1806), deputy of the nobility of Beauvais (Oise).
 Anne-Emmanuel-François-Georges de Crussol d'Amboise (1726–1794)
 Alexandre de Culant, (1733–1799), deputy of the nobility of the bailiwick of Angoulême.
 Adam Philippe, Comte de Custine, (1740–1793), Deputy to the Estates-General, bailiwick of Metz

D
 Luc Jacques Édouard Dauchy, (Count), (1757–1817), deputy of the Third Estate of Clermont, (Oise).
 Lucien David (1730–1792), (Abbot'), deputy of the clergy of the bailiwick of Beauvais, (Oise).
 Nicolas Pierre Antoine Delacour, deputy of the Third Estate of Senlis, (Oise).
 Claude-Pierre Dellay d'Agier, (1750–1827), deputy of the nobility of the province of Dauphiné.
 Guillaume-Antoine Delfaud, (1733–1792), deputy of the clergy of the Diocese of Sarlat.
 Joseph-Bernard Delilia de Crose, (1739–1804).
 Thomas-Joseph Desescoutes (1736–1791), deputy of the Third Estate of the bailiwick of Meaux.
 Pierre-Etienne Despatys de Courteille (1753–1841), deputy of the Third Estate of the bailiwicks of Melun and Moret-sur-Loing.
 Jean-Nicolas Démeunier (or Desmeunier), (1751–1814), deputy of the Third Estate.
 René Desmontiers de Mérinville (Bishop of Dijon) (d. 1792), deputy of the clergy of the bailiwick of Dijon.
 Antoine-Louis-Claude Destutt de Tracy (1754–1836), deputy of the nobility of Bourbonnais.
 Jean-Claude Dubois (1742–1836), deputy of the Third Estate of the sénéchaussée of Châtellerault.
 François-Marie Dubuat (1752–1807), alternate deputy of the Third Estate of the bailiwick of Meaux (On 14 May 1790, he replaced the Marquess of Aguesseau, who had resigned).
 Jean-Baptiste Dumayor (1758 – ca. 1793), alternate deputy of the Third Estate of the bailiwick of Sarreguemines, (On 21 January 1790, he replaced the Count of Helmstatt, who had resigned).
 Jean-Baptiste Dumouchelle, (1748–1820), deputy of the clergy of Paris.
 Pierre Samuel du Pont de Nemours (Pierre-Samuel Dupont, called) (1739–1817), deputy of the Third Estate of the bailiwick of Nemours.
 Adrien Duport

E
 Maurice Joseph Louis Gigost d'Elbée
 Jean-Louis Emmery
 Jean-Jacques Duval d'Eprémesnil (1745–1794), deputy of the nobility of Paris
 Louis Marie d'Estourmel, (1744–1823), deputy of the nobility.

F
 Jean Jacques Farochon (Abbot), deputy of the clergy of Crépy-en-Valois
 Gabriel Feydel (1744–1827), deputy of the Third Estate of the sénéchaussée of Quercy.
 Jean-Baptiste de Flachslanden, (1749–1822), deputy of the nobility of the bailiwick of Strasbourg.
 Jean-François Henri de Flaschlanden, deputy of the nobility of Colmar
 Emmanuel Marie Michel Philippe Fréteau de Saint-Just (1745–1794), deputy of the nobility of the bailiwicks of Melun and Moret-sur-Loing.

G
 Dominique Joseph Garat (1749–1833), deputy of the Third Estate des Basses-Pyrénées.
 Alexandre Gardiol, (? – ?), deputy of the clergy
 Jean Garnier, (1748–1824), deputy of the clergy of the bailiwick of Dol.
 Jean-François Gaultier de Biauzat (1739–1815), deputy of the Third Estate of the sénéchaussée of Clermont (Puy-de-Dôme).
 Christophe Antoine Gerle Chalini, (1735–1801), deputy of the clergy of the bailiwick of Riom.
 Jacques-Marie Glezen, (1737–1801), deputy of the Third Estate of the sénéchaussée of Rennes.
 Louis-Gabriel de Gomer (Count) (1718–1798), deputy of the noblesse of the bailiwick of Sarreguemines.
 Arnaud Gouges-Cartou, (1738), deputy of the Third Estate of the sénéchaussée of Quercy at Cahors.
 Henri Grégoire, also called Abbé Grégoire, (1750–1831), deputy of the clergy of the bailiwick of Nancy.
 Jean-Baptiste Grenier (1753–1838), deputy of the Third Estate of the sénéchaussée of Riom.
 Louis-Charles de Grieu (1755), deputy of the clergy of the bailiwick of Rouen, Seine-Maritime.
 Joseph-Marie Gros (1742–1792), priest of the Church of Saint Nicholas of Chardonnet, deputy of the clergy of Paris.
 Julien Guégan (1746–1794), deputy of the clergy of the diocese of Vannes, Morbihan.
 Joseph Ignace Guillotin, (1738–1814).

H

 Gustave Hainsselin
 Antoine Bernard Hanoteau, (1751–1822), deputy of the Third Estate of Crépy-en-Valois, (Oise).
 Mathurin François Hardy de Largère, (1729–1792), mayor of Vitré, deputy of the Third Estate of the sénéchaussée of Rennes, (Ille-et-Vilaine).
 Maximilien-Auguste Bleickard d'Helmstatt (Count) (1728–1802), deputy of the nobility of the bailiwick of Sarreguemines.
 Guillaume-Benoît Houdet (1744–1812), deputy of the Third Estate of the bailiwick of Meaux.
 Philippe d'Humières (Baron of Scorailles), (1748–1822), deputy of the nobility

J
 Etienne François Charles de Jaucen, (Baron of Poissac), (1733 – ?), deputy of the nobility of Limousin.
 François-Antoine-Nicolas Jersey (1754 – ?), alternate deputy of the Third Estate of the bailiwick of Sarreguemines, (On 21 January 1790, he replaced the Count of Gomer, who had resigned).
 Alexandre Paul Guérin de Tournel de Joyeuse de Chateauneuf-Randon (Marquess) (1757–1827), deputy of the nobility of the bailiwick of Mende.
 Pierre-Mathieu Joubert, deputy of the clergy of the bailiwick of Angoulême.

L
 Anne Louis Henri de La Fare, (1752–1829), Bishop of Nancy, deputy of the clergy of the bailiwick of Nancy, (Meurthe-et-Moselle).
 Dominique de La Rochefoucauld (1713–1800), (Cardinal), Archbishop of Rouen, deputy of the clergy of the bailiwick of Rouen, (Seine-Maritime).
 François Alexandre Frédéric, duc de La Rochefoucauld-Liancourt (1747–1827), deputy of the nobility of Clermont, (Oise).
 François de La Rochefoucauld-Bayers (d. 1792), Bishop-Count of Beauvais and pair de France, deputy of the clergy of Clermont (Oise).
 Pierre-Louis of the Rochefoucauld-Bayers (d. 1792), Bishop of Saintes, deputy of the clergy of Saintes (Charente-Maritime).
 Gilbert du Motier, Marquis de Lafayette (1757–1834)
 Trophime-Gérard, marquis de Lally-Tollendal (1751–1830)
 César-Guillaume de La Luzerne
 Alexandre-Théodore-Victor, comte de Lameth (1760–1829)
 Charles Malo François Lameth (1757–1832)
 Jean Denis, comte Lanjuinais
 Louis-Marie de La Révellière-Lépeaux (1753–1824)
 Charles César de Fay de La Tour-Maubourg (1757–1831)
 Armand Louis de Gontaut, duc de Lauzun et Biron, (1747–1793), deputy of the nobility of the sénéchaussée of Quercy at Cahors.
 Charles Leblanc, deputy of the Third Estate of Senlis, (Oise).
 Antoine-Éléonor-Léon Leclerc de Juigné, (1728–1811), Archbishop of Paris, Duke of Saint-Cloud, pair de France, deputy of the clergy of Paris.
 Isaac Le Chapelier
 Jean-Georges Lefranc de Pompignan
 Laurent-François Legendre, (1741–1802), deputy of the Third Estate of the sénéchaussée of Brest.
 Jean-Baptiste Lemoyne de Bellisle, deputy of the nobility of Chaumont-en-Vexin, (Oise).
 Louis-Michel Lepeletier de Saint-Fargeau (1760–1793)
 Gaston Pierre Marc Levis, (Duke of), deputy of the nobility of Senlis, (Oise).
 Jacques de Lombard-Taradeau, (1750 – ?), deputy of the Third Estate of the sénéchaussée of Draguignan.

M
 Jean-Baptiste de Malleret (Marquess of Saint-Maixant), deputy of the nobility
 Pierre Victor, baron Malouet (1740–1814), deputy of the Third Estate of Thiers
 Jean-Joseph Manhaval (1736–1813), deputy of the Third Estate of the sénéchaussée of Rouergue at Villefranche.
 Jean-Baptiste Massieu (1743–1814), deputy of the clergy of Senlis, (Oise).
 Jean-Antoine Maudru
 Jean-Sifrein Maury (l'Abbé Maury).
 Pierre-François Mayer (? – ?), deputy of the Third Estate of the bailiwick of Sarreguemines.
 Antoine-Jean-François Ménager (1756–1826), alternate deputy of the Third Estate of the bailiwick of Meaux. (In 1791 replaced his father-in-law, Thomas-Joseph Desescoutes, who had resigned for reasons of health.) Jacques François Menou, deputy of the nobility
 Claude Merceret, deputy of the clergy of the bailiwick of Dijon, Côte d'Or.
 Philippe-Antoine Merlin de Douai (1754–1838)
 François Anne Joseph Meurinne, deputy of the Third Estate of Clermont, (Oise).
 François Millon de Montherlant (1726–1794), deputy of the Third Estate of the bailiwick of Beauvais, (Oise).
 Samuel de Missy
 André Boniface Louis Riquetti de Mirabeau (1754–1795), called Mirabeau-Tonneau, deputy of the nobility of the sénéchaussée of Limoges.
 Honoré Gabriel Riqueti, comte de Mirabeau (1749–1791)
 Jean-Charles-Antoine Morel (1752–1832), alternate deputy of the bailiwick of Sarreguemines, (On 21 January 1790, he replaced Pierre-François Mayer, who had resigned).
 Ildut Moyot, (1749–1813), deputy of the Third Estate of the sénéchaussée of Brest.
 François-Xavier-Marc-Antoine de Montesquiou-Fézensac (1757–1832), deputy of the clergy of Paris
 Anne-Pierre, marquis de Montesquiou-Fézensac (1739–1798)
 Mathieu Jean Félicité, duc de Montmorency-Laval (1766–1826), deputy of the nobility of the bailiwick of Montfort-l'Amaury.
 Médéric Louis Élie Moreau de Saint-Méry (1750–1803)
 Jean Baptiste Mosneron de l'Aunay, (1738–1830)
 Jean Joseph Mounier, (1758–1806), deputy of the Third Estate of the Dauphiné.

N
 Jean Baptiste Nadal de Saintrac, (1745–1809).
 Louis-Marie de Nicolaï, (1729–1791), Bishop of Cahors, deputy of the clergy of the sénéchaussée of Quercy at Cahors.
 Louis Marc Antoine de Noailles, deputy of the nobility of the bailiwick of Nemours.

O
 Louis Philippe Joseph de Bourbon, duc d'Orléans, called Philippe Égalité (1747–1793), deputy of the nobility of Crépy-en-Valois, (Oise).
 Pierre Oudaille, deputy of the Third Estate of Beauvais, (Oise).

P
 Armand Jean Simon Brunet de Castelpers de Panat (Abbot), deputy of the clergy of Chaumont-en-Vexin, (Oise).
 Charles-Antoine Peretti della Rocca (1750–1815), deputy of the clergy of the Island of Corsica.
 Charles-César Perier (1748–1797), deputy of the clergy of the bailiwick of Étampes.
 Louis François Marie de Perusse d'Escars, (Count of Cars and Saint Bonnet), (1737–1814), deputy of the nobility of Limousin.
 Jérôme Pétion de Villeneuve, (1756–1794).
 Étienne-François-Charles Jaucen de Poissac (baron), (1733–1803), deputy of the nobility of the sénéchaussée of Tulle (Low country of Limousin).
 Pierre-Louis Prieur called Prieur of the Marne, (1756–1827).
 Jean Auguste de Chastenet de Puységur, (1740–1815), Archbishop of Bourges, deputy of the clergy of the bailiwick of Bourges (Cher).

R
 Jean-Paul Rabaut de Saint-Étienne, (1743–1793), deputy of the Third Estate of the sénéchaussée of Nîmes and of Beaucaire
 Jean-François Rewbell, called Reubell, (1747–1807)
 Jean François de Reynaud de Villevert, (Count), (1731 – ?), deputy of the North of the colony of Saint-Domingue.
 Gilbert de Riberolles, (1749–1823), deputy of the Third Estate of the sénéchaussée of Riom.
 Guillaume-Amable Robert de Chevannes, (1752–1828), deputy of the Third Estate of the sénéchaussée of Nevers.
 Maximilien de Robespierre (1758–1794), deputy of the Third Estate of Arras.
 Pierre-Louis Roederer, (1754–1835)
 Jean-Joseph Rocque, (1749- ?), deputy of the Third Estate of the sénéchaussée of Béziers.
 Jean-Joseph de Mougins de Roquefort, (1742–1822), deputy of the Third Estate of the sénéchaussée of Grasse.
 François Pierre Olivier de Rougé (marquis), (1756–1816), deputy of the nobility,
 Guillaume-Grégoire de Roulhac (1751–1824), deputy of the Third Estate of the sénéchaussée of Limoges (High country of Limousin).
 Pierre-Jean de Ruallem (?-?), Abbot of Saint-Faron de Meaux, alternate deputy of the clergy of the bailiwick of Meaux. (On 29 octobre 1789 he replaced Pierre-Louis Barbou, who had resigned.)S
 Pierre-François de Saint-Martial,
 Claude-Anne de Saint-Simon, (Marquess), (1743–1819), deputy of the nobility of the bailiwick of Angoulême.
 Christophe Saliceti, (1757–1809), deputy of the Third Estate of the Island of Corsica.
 Étienne François Sallé de Chou (1754–1832), deputy of the Berry.
 Louis-Joseph Schmits (1758–1819), deputy of the Third Estate of the bailiwick of Sarreguemines
 Emmanuel-Joseph Sieyès (1748–1836).

T
 Charles Maurice de Talleyrand-Périgord (1754–1838)
 Armand-Constant Tellier (1755–1795), deputy of the Third Estate of the bailiwicks of Melun and Moret-sur-Loing.
 Anne-Alexandre-Marie Thibault (?-1813 ?), deputy of the clergy of the bailiwick of Nemours
 Jean Thomas (?-?), deputy of the clergy of the bailiwick of Melun-Moret.
 Jacques Guillaume Thouret (1746–1794)
 Jean-Baptiste Treilhard
 François Denis Tronchet
 Jean de Turckheim, deputy of the Third Estate of the bailiwick of Strasbourg

V
 Marc Guillaume Alexis Vadier (1736–1828)
 Pierre-Vincent Varin de la Brunelière, (1752–1794), alternate deputy of the Third Estate of the sénéchaussée of Rennes (replaced Étienne Eusèbe Joseph Huard after the latter's death (1789)).
 Louis Verdet (1744–1819), deputy of the clergy of the bailiwick of Sarreguemines.
 Théodore Vernier (1731–1818), deputy of the Third Estate of the sénéchaussée of Lons-le-Saunier.
 François Xavier Veytard (1731–1797), deputy of the clergy of Paris
 Pierre-André-François Viau de Thébaudières, (1751 – ?), deputy of the North of the colony of Saint-Domingue.
 Jean-Georges-Charles Voidel (1758 – ca. 1793), deputy of the Third Estate of the bailiwick of Sarreguemines.
 Alexandre-Eugène Volfius, deputy of the Third Estate of the bailiwick of Dijon, Côte d'Or.
 Constantin-François Chassebœuf, comte de Volney, (1757–1820)

 Notes 
 Note 1: The names of alternate deputies who sat are indicated in italics. When known, the names of the deputies they replaced are indicated after the alternates' names.
 Note 2: For the distinction between bailliage (here given as "bailiwick") and sénéchaussée'', see bailiwick.

Bibliography 
Principally derived from Notices et Portraits des Députés de 1789, from the French National Assembly site.

References

 
1789 in France